Veys Rural District is a rural district (dehestan) in Veys District, Bavi County, Khuzestan Province, Iran. At the 2006 census, its population was 23,322, in 3,916 families.  The rural district has 38 villages.

References 

Rural Districts of Khuzestan Province
Bavi County